Grigoriadis or Gregoriades is a Greek surname, deriving from the given name Grigorios (Gregory). The feminine form is Grigoriadi (Γρηγοριάδη) or Grigoriadou/Gregoriadou (Γρηγοριάδου). Notable people with the surname include:

Afroditi Grigoriadou (1931–2020), Greek actress
Aristeidis Grigoriadis (born 1985), Greek swimmer
Elpida Grigoriadou (born 1971), Greek rower
Mary Grigoriadis (born 1942), American artist
Michail Grigoriadis, Ottoman Greek official, Prince of Samos
Neokosmos Grigoriadis (1879–1967), Greek general and politician
Solon Grigoriadis (1912–1994), Greek naval officer, journalist, and politician
Vanessa Grigoriadis, American journalist